Jhonata de Lima Ferreira or simply Jhonata  (born September 10, 1992 in Eusébio), is a Brazilian defensive midfielder. He currently plays for the Águia Negra .

Honours

Club
 Santa Cruz
 Pernambuco State League: 2011

References

External links
  Ogol
  Soccerway

1992 births
Living people
Brazilian footballers
Santa Cruz Futebol Clube players
Timbaúba Futebol Clube players
Treze Futebol Clube players
Central Sport Club players
Belo Jardim Futebol Clube players
Association football forwards